Rowland Edward Lee (born August 19, 1960) is a composer, pianist and conductor.  In addition to his many published concert works, he is also one of the US's premier TV, theatre and media composers and musical arrangers with over 600 episodes of various series and short films to his credit. Lee is perhaps best known for writing the theme song of the animated TV series Pablo the Little Red Fox, 64 Zoo Lane and for his orchestration of Sir Matthew Bourne's Swan Lake which is currently the most performed dance production in the world.

Early life
Lee was born in Woking, Surrey to parents Brian and Dilys Lee (née Lucas).  He attended Sheerwater Secondary School then transferred to Woking Boys Grammar School and Woking VI Form College.  From 1978-1982 Lee was organist and choirmaster of Christ Church, Woking.  From 1979-1984 Lee attended The Royal College of Music studying music composition (under the tutelage of Joseph Horovitz and Philip Cannon), piano and conducting.  In 1982 Lee was elected president of the Royal College’s Student Association in the College's centenary year. He graduated with Honours in 1984.

Career
Prior to graduation from the Royal College of Music, Lee was approached by the Royal College of Art to compose soundtracks for two films by then animation student, Janet Simmonds.  The short films entitled:  The Waterfall and Merlin, taken together, won Lee the 1986 British Film Institute's Anthony Asquith Young Composer Award.  This marked the reinstitution of this prize which has been awarded every year since.  Subsequently, this led to Lee's writing extensively for animation films and TV soundtracks.  In addition to his work in animation, Lee has composed and arranged for Ballet, Musical Theatre and both secular and religious concert music.

Animation
 Cloudbabies 
 Pablo the Little Red Fox (1999)
 Wilf the Witch's Dog (2002)
 64 Zoo Lane  (1999-2000)
 Salut Serge
 Engie Benjy
 Crapston Villas
 The Little Reindeer
 Captain Abercromby
 Henry's Cat

Theatre
 A Spoonful of Sherman
 Bumblescratch
 Ann Veronica
 The Amazons
 Vanity Fair 
 Marry Me a Little 
 Ruthless! 
 Swan Lake

Concert Music
 Requiem
 Elegy
 Oboe Sonata
 Violin Concerto
 Snow Dance (Celesta Concerto)

Awards
 The Amazons CD received a Grammy Award nomination for "Best Cast Album".
 In 1985 Lee became the first recipient of the British Film Institute’s Anthony Asquith Young Composer Award.

References

External links
 Rowland Lee Official Website
 "Requiem" by Rowland Lee 
 

1960 births
20th-century classical composers
21st-century classical composers
English classical composers
Living people
Alumni of the Royal College of Music
English male classical composers
20th-century English composers
21st-century English composers
20th-century British male musicians
21st-century British male musicians